Endure Pursuivant of Arms is a private officer of arms appointed in 2006 by the Chief of the Name and Arms of Lindsay—the Earl of Crawford and Balcarres. The current Endure Pursuivant is the Earl's younger son, The Hon. Alexander Walter Lindsay.

Offices of arms